Mulberry, North Carolina may refer to the following census-designated places:

Mulberry, Surry County, North Carolina
Mulberry, Wilkes County, North Carolina